Mac Classic may refer to:

 Macintosh Classic, a model of Macintosh computer
 Classic Environment, a compatibility layer for Mac OS 9 included in Mac OS X
 Classic Mac OS, versions of Mac OS before Mac OS X